James Smith Raeside (1879 – 17 January 1946) was a Scottish footballer who played as a goalkeeper.

Career
Raeside was born in Glasgow, the son of William Raeside and Margaret Smith. He played club football for Parkhead, Third Lanark and Bury. He won the Scottish Football League with Third Lanark in 1903–04 (playing in all 26 fixtures) and the Scottish Cup in 1905. During his spell in England with Bury, he scored three penalties in league matches.

At representative level, he was selected for the Glasgow FA's annual challenge match against Sheffield on two occasions, played in the 'Home Scots v Anglo-Scots' international trial in 1905, and then made one appearance for Scotland in 1906.

He married first to Margaret Lawrie Beck in 1904 in Scotland. She died in 1908. He married secondly Florence Williamson in 1910 in Manchester.

References

1879 births
1946 deaths
Scottish footballers
Scotland international footballers
Parkhead F.C. players
Third Lanark A.C. players
Scottish Football League players
Bury F.C. players
Association football goalkeepers
Footballers from Glasgow
Date of birth missing
Place of death missing
Scotland junior international footballers
Scottish Junior Football Association players